Arne Næss Jr. (born Arne Rudolf Ludvig Raab; 8 December 1937 – 13 January 2004, aged 66) was a Norwegian businessman and the second ex-husband of Diana Ross.

Early life
Næss was born in Germany in 1937 to German physician August Oskar German Raab (1901–1993) and Kirsten "Kiki" Dekke Næss (1907–2001), a Norwegian national whose uncle was philosopher and mountaineer Arne Næss. Næss' family lived in Germany during World War II. His parents divorced after the war, and Næss moved to Norway with his mother where they both took her maiden name Næss.

Career
In 1964, Næss moved to New York to work for his uncle Erling Dekke Næss, a shipping magnate and businessman. He started his own business in London in 1968 where he was successful in shipping and oil, and in real estate. He would go on to make a few bad investments in the 1990s in Pyramid scheme Global Money Games. His biggest success was an investment in an IT business, Tandberg Data, and various global real estate investments. At the time of his death in 2004, Næss' shipping empire was reputedly worth some 600 million. He spent his final years in Switzerland.

Personal life
In 1966, Næss married Filippa Kumlin d'Orey of Sweden and together they had a son, Christoffer, and two daughters, Katinka and folk pop crossover singer Leona Næss. After they divorced, he was in a relationship with Norwegian actress Mari Maurstad. In 1985, Næss met American singer Diana Ross on a trip to the Bahamas. He and Ross married in 1986 and had two sons, Ross Arne Næss (born October 7, 1987) and Evan Olav Næss (born August 26, 1988). Through his marriage, he gained three stepdaughters, Rhonda Ross Kendrick (Ross' daughter with Motown Records founder Berry Gordy), Chudney Ross, and Tracee Ellis Ross; the latter two being Ross' daughters from her first marriage to music executive Robert Ellis Silberstein. The couple divorced in 2000, after it was revealed that Næss fathered a child with Camilla Astrup. Næss spent his remaining five years with Norwegian-born Camilla Astrup; they had two sons, Nicklas and Louis.

Mountaineering
By age 19, Næss had already made twenty first ascents of Norwegian mountains. In the 1960s, he focused primarily on his career. In the 1970s, he returned to mountain climbing. In 1985, he led the first Norwegian expedition to Mount Everest. Also participating was British mountaineer Chris Bonington. When asked, during a late-1990s television interview, about the risks of mountaineering, Næss replied, "If I hadn't liked risks, I would rather have played tennis or golf."

Death
Næss was staying with his friend Johann Rupert on 13 January 2004 when he died in a climbing accident while descending from a peak on Rupert's estate in the Groot Drakenstein mountains near the town of Franschhoek outside Cape Town, South Africa. According to police reports, Næss' anchoring equipment loosened from the porous mountainside, leading to a 103-metre fall. He was 66 years old.

In May 2004, Næss was posthumously awarded the Laureus Lifetime Achievement Award.

See also
List of 20th-century summiters of Mount Everest

References

External links
'Arne was no daredevil', claim friends  (from Norwegian daily Aftenposten)
BBC news report of Næss' death
"Arne Næss Jr remembered" (photos from his memorial service)
Details and climbing history of 7 summiteer Arne Næss (www.7summits.com) 
 The family tree of Arne Næss Jr. on Geni.com

1937 births
2004 deaths
Norwegian mountain climbers
Norwegian people of German descent
Laureus World Sports Awards winners
Mountaineering deaths
Sport deaths in South Africa
Accidental deaths in South Africa